"Square Biz" is a 1981 song by American R&B singer, Teena Marie. Bass player and frequent collaborator Allen McGrier is credited as the co-writer along with Marie. The song was released as a single from the album It Must Be Magic, and became one of Marie's signature songs. The song includes a rap break, an unusual feature at the time.

Cover versions and appearances in media 
In 2002, a new version of this song, titled "Hollywood Square Biz", was used as the theme to the popular game show Hollywood Squares when it was known as H2 at the time from 2002 to 2004.<ref>Playlist Eleven of Teena Marie mlive.com/entertainment/detroit</ref>

In 2000 "Crip Hop" (Tha Eastsidaz featuring  Snoop Dogg). Baby Boy soundtrack containing hip-hop and R&B music was released by Universal Records on June 19, 2001

In 2002, En Vogue performed a cover of the song on their concert DVD, Live in the USA.

Missy Elliott uses an interpolation of a verse from Square Biz in Ciara's 2004 hit single, "1, 2 Step".

The Firm's "Firm Biz" contains a sample based on the song featuring Dawn Robinson from their first and only album The Album'' in 1997.

"Real Love" by Master P featuring Sera-Lynn, 2002

Chart performance 
The song managed to peak at #3 on Billboard's R&B Charts, becoming Marie's highest peak on the chart at the time. The song managed to peak at #12 on Billboard's Club Play Singles, while performing moderately on Billboard's Pop Singles, peaking only at #50, becoming her second single to chart on the Pop Singles chart.

Charts

Chart positions

References

1981 singles
Teena Marie songs
1981 songs
Gordy Records singles